What Happens in Vegas is a 2008 American romantic comedy film directed by Tom Vaughan and written by Dana Fox. It stars Cameron Diaz and Ashton Kutcher as a couple who get married and win a casino jackpot prize during a drunken night in Las Vegas, but their simple plan to get a quick divorce and divide the money is complicated by the divorce court judge's ruling. The title is based on the Las Vegas marketing catchphrase "What Happens in Vegas, Stays in Vegas." Despite negative reviews from critics, the film was a box office success.

Plot
In New York City, high-strung commodity futures trader Joy Ellis McNally (Cameron Diaz) is dumped by fiancé Mason at his surprise birthday party which she throws. At the same time, easy-going carpenter Jack Fuller Jr. (Ashton Kutcher) is fired by his father, Jack Sr. Both are distraught and, with best friends Toni "Tipper" (Lake Bell), who is a bartender, and Jeff "Hater" (Rob Corddry), a lawyer, take debauched trips to Las Vegas.

Joy and Jack meet by chance when given the same hotel room due to a computer error. Once the misunderstanding is cleared up and receiving upgraded rooms and coupons to various clubs, they party and drink together and end up getting married. The next morning, agreeing it was a mistake, they plan to divorce.

Before they can, Jack uses a quarter Joy gives him in a slot machine. He hits a three million dollar jackpot and Joy reminds him they are married and hence, she is entitled to half of the money. They return to New York, where they attempt to divorce. The judge declares they cannot divorce until they attempt to co-exist for six months, while attending weekly sessions with marriage counselor Dr. Twitchell. If they work at the marriage but still want to divorce after six months, each can keep half the winnings. If either party does not cooperate, the money will be tied up in litigation by the judge.

The newlyweds devise more and more cunning schemes to undermine each other, such as Jack telling Joy that their counseling session is canceled to show she is not committed, and Joy inviting girls to their apartment to seduce him, throwing a party. Jack gives Joy's ex-fiancé, Mason, her engagement ring back without Joy knowing. However, at Joy's work retreat, they unexpectedly find themselves attracted to each other.

Returning from the retreat, it is time for the judge to decide what happens to the money. On her way to the hearing, Joy sees Mason, who tells her he wants her back. Giving back the engagement ring, he tells her she is good enough for him. Joy thinks Jack set her up with Mason to cheat on him to guarantee divorce. She walks away from Mason and goes to the hearing. There, the marriage counselor testifies that the couple worked on the marriage. The judge decides they will split the remaining 1.4 million dollars (after taxes, bills Joy ran up, and money Jack spent on his new woodworking business). Joy tells the judge she does not want any of the money and as she leaves she gives the engagement ring to Jack, telling him she wants nothing from him.

Joy is offered the promotion, but declines it, telling her boss she would rather be happy doing nothing than miserable doing something she hates. Jack's parents tell him it looks like he and Joy are in love. Realizing his mistake, he goes to find her. Tipper tells Jack that she quit her job and nobody knows where she is. He suspects that she has gone to Fire Island, New York, the only place that makes her feel truly happy. Finding her, Jack proposes (again) and she says yes.

During the closing credits, there are scenes from the day Jack and Joy get married, of Tipper and Hater subsequently enacting a plan of revenge on Mason, and of Hater cutting off Dave.

Cast
 Cameron Diaz as Joy McNally
Ashton Kutcher as Jack Fuller, Jr.
Lake Bell as Toni "Tipper" Saxson
 Rob Corddry  as Jeffrey "Hater" Lewis
 Dennis Farina as Richard "Dick" Banger
 Dennis Miller as Judge Whopper
 Krysten Ritter as Kelly
 Jason Sudeikis as Mason
 Michelle Krusiec as Chong
 Billy Eichner as Band Leader
 Queen Latifah as Dr. Twitchell
 Zach Galifianakis as Dave
 Treat Williams as Jack Fuller, Sr.
 Deirdre O'Connell as Mrs. Fuller

Release
The film had its world premiere at the Odeon in Leicester Square, London on April 22, 2008. Twentieth Century Fox held the U.S. premiere on May 1, 2008, at the Mann Village Theatre in Westwood, CA. It opened in wide release in the United States on May 9, 2008.

American Big Brother 9 housemates Ryan and Sharon were given a special screening of the film after winning a "luxury competition" in April. They were also awarded tickets to the May 1 Hollywood premiere.

Reception

Box office
What Happens in Vegas grossed $80.3 million in the United States and Canada and $131.4 million in other territories for a total of $219.4 million worldwide, against a production budget of $35 million.

In its opening weekend, the film grossed $20.2 million in 3,215 theaters in the United States and Canada, finishing second at the box office behind Iron Man.

Critical response 
What Happens in Vegas received generally negative reviews from critics. On Rotten Tomatoes the film has a rating of 25%, based on 133 reviews, with an average rating of 4.50/10. The site's critical consensus reads, "What Happens in Vegas has a few laughs, but mostly settles for derivative romantic comedy conventions and receives little help from a pair of unlikable leads." On Metacritic the film has a score of 36 out of 100, based on 31 critics, indicating "generally unfavorable reviews".

Manohla Dargis of The New York Times slammed it, stating that What Happens in Vegas is "one of those junky time-wasters that routinely pop up in movie theaters". Metromix Chicago's Matt Pais called it "bland, boring and not fun at all".

The film received two Razzie Award nominations including Worst Actress (Cameron Diaz) and Worst Screen Couple (Cameron Diaz and Ashton Kutcher). Both awards went to Paris Hilton for The Hottie and the Nottie.

See also
 List of films set in Las Vegas

References

External links

 
 
 
 
 
 
 What Happens in Vegas... Production Notes 

2008 films
2000s English-language films
20th Century Fox films
2008 romantic comedy films
21 Laps Entertainment films
2000s sex comedy films
American romantic comedy films
American sex comedy films
Dune Entertainment films
Films about marriage
Films about weddings
Films set in the Las Vegas Valley
Films set in New York City
Films shot in the Las Vegas Valley
Films shot in New York City
Films directed by Tom Vaughan (director)
Films scored by Christophe Beck
Regency Enterprises films
2000s American films